Jean Cook (born 1991) is a South African rugby union player.

Jean Cook(e) may also refer to:

Jean-Paul Cook (1927–2005), Canadian politician
J. Lawrence Cook (1899–1976), American piano roll artist
Jean Cook, violinist in Ida (band)
Jean Cooke (1927–2008), English painter

See also
Gene Cook, American football player